The FIDE Grand Prix 2008–2010 was a series of six chess tournaments that formed part of the qualification for the World Chess Championship 2012. It was administered by FIDE, the World Chess Federation. The event was won by Levon Aronian, with Teimour Radjabov second and Alexander Grischuk third.

The top two finishers here formed two of the eight players who played in the 2012 Candidates Tournament to determine the challenger for the world champion. After Magnus Carlsen withdrew from the Candidates, Grischuk took his place, due to his third place in the Grand Prix.

The winner of the Grand Prix was originally scheduled to play a match in 2010 against the winner of the Chess World Cup 2009, with the winner of that match becoming the challenger for the World Chess Championship 2012. On November 25, 2008, FIDE announced major changes, with the winner and runner-up qualifying instead for an eight-player Candidates Tournament. This caused a number of protests, with Magnus Carlsen and Michael Adams withdrawing, and two other players being replaced. (For details, see World Chess Championship 2012.)

A number of host cities withdrew, causing all the tournaments except the first two to be rescheduled.

Format
There were six tournaments spread over 2008, 2009 and 2010. Each of the 21 participating players was originally scheduled to play in exactly four of the six tournaments; though this was complicated when some players withdrew partway through.

Each tournament is a 14 player, single round-robin tournament. In each round players scored 1 point for a win, ½ point for a draw and 0 for a loss. Grand prix points were then allocated according to each player's standing in the tournament: 180 grand prix points for first place, 150 for second place, 130 for third place, and then 110 down to 10 points for places four to fourteen (decreasing by 10 points for each place). (Grand Prix points were split between players on equal tournament points).

Players only counted their best three tournament results. The player with the most grand prix points was the winner.

If a tie-break was needed for the overall grand prix winner, the system was:
 The fourth result not already in the top three performances
 The number of actual game points scored in the four tournaments
 The number of first-place finishes
 The number of second-place finishes 
 The number of won games
 Drawing of lots

Tournament dates

The tournament dates and locations were as follows:

 April 19 – May 6, 2008, Baku, Azerbaijan
 July 30 – August 15, 2008, Sochi, Russia
 December 13–29, 2008, Elista, Russia (rescheduled from Doha, Qatar, in November 2008)
 April 14–30, 2009, Nalchik, Russia (rescheduled from Montreux, Switzerland)
 August 9–24, 2009, Jermuk, Armenia (rescheduled from Elista, Russia)
 May 9–25, 2010, Astrakhan, Russia (rescheduled from Karlovy Vary, Czech Republic, in October 2009)

Draw rules
A variation from normal chess rules was that the players were not allowed to talk to each other during the game and a draw by agreement was not allowed.  A draw has to be claimed with the arbiter, who was assisted by an active grandmaster who had the title for at least ten years. The only draws allowed (except for stalemate) were:
 Threefold repetition of position
 Fifty-move rule 
 Perpetual check
 A theoretical draw.

Participants

Qualification

 The four players who (at the start of 2008) were still in contention for the 2008 and 2010 championships qualified: Viswanathan Anand, Vladimir Kramnik, Veselin Topalov and Gata Kamsky.
 Apart from the winner Kamsky, the next top three finishers at the Chess World Cup 2007 qualified: Alexei Shirov, Sergey Karjakin and Magnus Carlsen.
 Seven players were selected on rating. The rating used was the average of the January and October 2007 ratings. FIDE released a list of the top 25 players according to this formula. The first seven players on the list (apart from those who had otherwise qualified) had automatic qualification: Vassily Ivanchuk, Shakhriyar Mamedyarov, Peter Leko, Alexander Morozevich, Levon Aronian, Teimour Radjabov and Boris Gelfand. FIDE also announced that the first four reserves, in order, were Michael Adams, Peter Svidler, Judit Polgár and Alexander Grischuk.
 The FIDE president may nominate one player from the top 40 in the world. If there were withdrawals, he may nominate more than one.
 The six host cities may each nominate one player rated above 2500. The host cities nominated the following players:
 Baku, Azerbaijan – Vugar Gashimov
 Sochi, Russia – Dmitry Jakovenko
 Doha, Qatar – Mohamad Al-Modiahki
 Montreux, Switzerland – Yannick Pelletier
 Elista, Russia – Ernesto Inarkiev
 Karlovy Vary, Czech Republic – David Navara

Prominent non-participants

Of the original 14 players who qualified, Anand, Kramnik and Topalov (2008/2010 contenders), Shirov (World Cup 2007) and Morozevich (ratings list) were all not taking part. One of the first four nominated reserves, Judit Polgár was also not participating. The lineup for the Grand Prix included 13 of the 20 top-rated Grandmasters at the time it was announced, though none of the top four.

The only one to publicly give a reason was Alexander Morozevich, who announced that he was boycotting the Grand Prix, saying the process was too long, unwieldy and disorganised. He claimed that Anand, Kramnik and Topalov were also boycotting. The Week in Chess reported that Kramnik and Topalov were not participating because the event had insufficient prize money.

Josef Resch of Universal Event Promotion (organizer of 2008 World Championship) also spoke about the difficulties in organizational details with FIDE in the totality of the World Chess Championship cycle.

Original participants
On March 5, 2008, FIDE released the list of participants, along with their world rankings according to the January 2008 ratings list (shown here in brackets).

 1 from the 2008/2010 cycle: Gata Kamsky (15).
 2 from the Chess World Cup 2007: Magnus Carlsen (13), Sergey Karjakin (14).
 6 from the rating list: Shakhriyar Mamedyarov (6), Peter Leko (8), Vassily Ivanchuk (9), Levon Aronian (10), Boris Gelfand (11), Teimour Radjabov (12)
 2 from the reserve ratings list: Michael Adams (16), Alexander Grischuk (21)
 4 FIDE president nominees: Peter Svidler (5), Ivan Cheparinov (19), Étienne Bacrot (22), Wang Yue (25).
 6 Host city nominees: Dmitry Jakovenko (17), Ernesto Inarkiev (34), David Navara (37), Vugar Gashimov (48), Yannick Pelletier (165), Mohamad Al-Modiahki (274).

Changes after the second and third tournaments

After Doha and Montreux refused to host tournaments, their nominees Al-Modiahki and Pelletier were removed from the series. Carlsen and Adams withdrew from the Grand Prix. These players were replaced by Evgeny Alekseev, Pavel Eljanov, Rustam Kasimdzhanov (from the rating list) and Vladimir Akopian (Jermuk nominee) from the third tournament onwards.

After Karlovy Vary withdrew in January 2009 (after the third tournament), the Karlovy Vary nominee David Navara was also excluded from the Grand Prix, and was not replaced.

Prize money

The Regulations indicate the following disbursement of prize monies.

For each event there was 162000 euros available (for 14 players), and 300000 euros in the overall standings (top 10).

Events crosstables

Baku, April–May 2008

The first Grand Prix event began on April 20, 2008 and concluded on May 5, 2008 (Elo average 2717, Cat. XIX).

The final crosstable was as follows:

Sochi, July–August 2008

The second Grand Prix event began on July 31, 2008 and concluded on August 14, 2008 (Elo average 2708, Cat. XIX). 
 
The final crosstable was as follows:

Elista, December 2008

The third tournament was held in Elista between 14 and 28 December 2008 (Elo average 2713, Cat. XIX).

Nalchik, April 2009

The fourth tournament was held in Nalchik, Kabardino-Balkaria between 14 and 29 April 2009 (Elo average 2725, Cat. XX).

Jermuk, August 2009

The fifth tournament took place in Jermuk, Armenia between 8 and 24 August 2009 (Elo average 2719, Cat. XIX).

The tournament was won by Ivanchuk. Aronian took equal second, sufficient for him to win the Grand Prix.

Astrakhan, May 2010

The sixth tournament took place in Astrakhan, Russia between 9 and 25 May 2010 (Elo average 2730, Cat. XX).

Grand Prix standings
Grand Prix points in bold indicate a tournament win. A number in brackets is a player's worst result of four and doesn't add to the total.

Aronian scored enough points to win the Grand Prix before the last event took place. Hence he decided not to play the last tournament of the Grand Prix.

Qual. = Qualification: CH = World Championship, CP = World Cup, RL = rating list, RR = reserve rating list, PR = presidential nominee, HC = host city nominee

Notes: Gata Kamsky was later granted a place in the 2012 Candidates Tournament as runner-up of the 2009 Challenger Match. Boris Gelfand qualified for the Candidates Tournament by winning the Chess World Cup 2009. Magnus Carlsen qualified for the Candidates Tournament by rating (average of July 2009 and January 2010 FIDE rating lists). Later Magnus Carlsen withdrew from the Candidates Tournament, and he was replaced by Alexander Grischuk, who took third place in the Grand Prix. Shakhriyar Mamedyarov was later granted a place in the Candidates Tournament as organisers' wild card.

Notes

External links
http://grandprix.fide.com/ Official FIDE website, including links to websites for each individual event.

FIDE Grand Prix
2008 in chess
2009 in chess
2010 in chess